Sandoval Township is located in Marion County, Illinois. As of the 2010 census, its population was 2,322 and it contained 1,005 housing units.

Geography 
Sandoval Township (W½ T2N R1E) is centered at 38°36'N 89°7'W (38.362, -89.068). It is transversed north–south by U.S. Route 51 and east–west by U.S. Route 50. The city of Sandoval is located in the center of the township and Junction City is located in the southern part.

Prior to 1896 Sandoval Township was the western part of Odin Township.

Demographics

Adjacent townships 
 Carrigan Township (north and northeast)
 Odin Township (east)
 Centralia Township (southeast and south)
 Brookside Township, Clinton County (southwest)
 Meridian Township, Clinton County (west)
 East Fork Township, Clinton County (northwest)

References

External links
US Census
City-data.com
Illinois State Archives

Townships in Marion County, Illinois
Populated places established in 1896
Townships in Illinois